Through the Madness, Vol. 1 is an EP by Nashville country duo Maddie & Tae, released January 28, 2022 by UMG Recordings. The country pop release is the first half of an upcoming full album, with the latter half set to release September 23.

Singles and music video 
The EP was preceded by the singles "Woman You Got", released March 31, 2021, "Madness", released October 29, 2021, (from which the EP's name was derived) and "Strangers", released on January 7, 2022. "Woman You Got" also got a music video that released June 30, 2021, which starred the duo and featured scenes referencing the films Clueless and Risky Business and guest appearances by their husbands Jonah Font and Josh Kerr.

Commercial performance 
The EP peaked at 46 on Billboards Top Current Album Sales chart, and 79 on the Top Album Sales chart.

Reception 

Hollers Will Groff wrote that the duo are "arguably playing it safe" but even then "make for a captivating pair" with "nuances to certain songs that reward paying full attention", but that "one only wishes there were more of them."

Track listing

Personnel

Musicians 
Maddie & Tae
 Maddie Font – vocals
 Taylor Kerr – vocals

Additional musicians
 Kris Donegan – electric guitar
 David Dorn – keyboards
 Evan Hutchings – drums
 Josh Kerr – electric guitar, acoustic guitar (7), programming (7)
 Tony Lucido – bass guitar
 Lori McKenna – vocals (6)
 Justin Schipper – steel guitar (2, 6)
 Morgane Stapleton – vocals (3)
 Bryan Sutton – acoustic guitar (1, 2, 4-6, 8)
 Ilya Toshinsky – acoustic guitar (3, 7)
 Derek Wells – electric guitar

Production 
 Adam Ayan – mastering engineer (3, 4, 6-8)
 Sean Badum – assistant recording engineer (5)
 Dave Clauss – recording engineer, mixing engineer
 Joel McKenney – assistant recording engineer (2)
 Jimmy Robbins – recording engineer
 Derek Wells – recording engineer
 Mike "Frog" Griffith – production coordinator

References 

2022 EPs
Maddie & Tae EPs
Albums produced by Jimmy Robbins
Universal Music Group albums
Country pop albums